Charles Shaw was an engineer best known for overseeing building of the Northwestern Turnpike.

An inscription at US 50, Capon Bridge says:
In 1784, Washington proposed the Northwestern Turnpike as an all-Virginia route to the Ohio. Authorized in 1827 and started in 1831, it remains a monument to the skill of its engineers, Charles Shaw and Colonel Claudius Crozet.

American civil engineers
Date of death unknown
Date of birth unknown